Durgi is a village in Palnadu district of the Indian state of Andhra Pradesh. It is the mandal headquarters of Durgi mandal in Gurazala revenue division. In 15th century, Durgi stone craft was originated in the village.

Geography 

Governance 
Durgi gram panchayat is the local self-government of the village. It is divided into wards and each ward is represented by a ward member.

Education 

As per the school information report for the academic year 2018–19, the village has 6 MPP, one KGBV, one model and 7 private schools.

References 

Villages in Palnadu district